Church Home for Aged, Infirm and Disabled Colored People is a historic hospital building for African Americans located at Brodnax, Brunswick County, Virginia. It was built in 1881–1883, and is a three-story, 6,000-square-foot wood-frame structure with horizontal lapped weatherboard walls and a slate clipped-gable roof.  Also on the property are a contributing hospital supervisor's residence and smokehouse. The house is now used as a bed and breakfast establishment.

It was listed on the National Register of Historic Places in 2004.

References

Bed and breakfasts in Virginia
Hospital buildings on the National Register of Historic Places in Virginia
Buildings and structures in Brunswick County, Virginia
Churches completed in 1883
National Register of Historic Places in Brunswick County, Virginia
Historic districts on the National Register of Historic Places in Virginia
African-American history of Virginia